Héctor José "Guanaco" Costa Massironi (30 July 1929 – 23 May 2010) was a basketball player from Uruguay.

He won twice the bronze medal with the men's national team at the Summer Olympics: in 1952 and 1956. He competed in three consecutive Olympics for his native country, starting in 1952 (Helsinki, Finland).

He died in 2010, aged 80. His remains are buried at Cementerio del Buceo, Montevideo.

References

External links

 Héctor Costa's obituary 

1929 births
2010 deaths
Sportspeople from Montevideo
Basketball players at the 1952 Summer Olympics
Basketball players at the 1956 Summer Olympics
Basketball players at the 1960 Summer Olympics
Olympic basketball players of Uruguay
Olympic bronze medalists for Uruguay
Uruguayan men's basketball players
Place of death missing
Olympic medalists in basketball
Burials at Cementerio del Buceo, Montevideo
Medalists at the 1956 Summer Olympics
Medalists at the 1952 Summer Olympics
1954 FIBA World Championship players